Christopher John Cleverly (born 27 July 1967) is a British lawyer, entrepreneur, philanthropist and businessman involved with ventures in Africa.  He is a cousin of James Cleverly MP, the UK Foreign Secretary.

Early life and education 
Cleverly was born in Essex, United Kingdom, in July 1967. He holds an LL.B. from King's College London (1988) and an Honorary Degree of Doctor of Laws from the University of Reading (2014).

Cleverly's cousin is British politician James Cleverly, the Conservative MP for Braintree, and current Foreign Secretary.

Career 
Cleverley was called to the bar in 1990. He was the youngest head of barrister's chambers while at Trafalgar Chambers (1999). He is today a practising barrister with Millennium Chambers in London.

During the 1990s, Chris Cleverly presented on Channel 4 and contributed to other television channels, radio and newspapers.

In 2005, with British designer Ozwald Boateng, Cleverly co-founded the Made In Africa Foundation, a Uganda-based organisation established to provide first-stage funding and business development of infrastructure projects. Cleverly was co-architect of a $1.5bn “Africa50” fund in conjunction with the African Development Bank.

Later described by The Times as a someone "who ... has skipped from venture to venture with little apparent success", Cleverly joined AIM-listed African Potash as its chairman in 2015. In the same time period, Peter Hain and Mark Simmonds also joined as directors. African Potash was developing the Lac Dinga potash project in the Republic of Congo. However, the business collapsed in value and was delisted from AIM. Later renamed Block Commodities it then focused on blockchain technology in 2018. In 2019, Block Commodities was licensed to grow and import medicinal cannabis, striking deals to buy land in Sierra Leone. However, the deals then collapsed, Cleverly stepped down as chair, and the firm's shares were suspended.

Also in 2019, Cleverly, then a partner at private equity firm PAI Capital, led a bid to buy West Ham United Football Club.

Cleverly is also the president of Tingo, Inc, a Nigeria-based agri-fintech company, and of Tingo International Holdings, an investment company.

Other activities 
Cleverly is a member of the International Tribunal for Natural Justice, which holds hearings on issues which it claims are being ignored by governments, giving "publicity to discredited medical professionals or conspiracy theorists." In 2019, at an ITNJ hearing, he publicly questioned the safety of 5G.

A portrait of Cleverly is in the National Portrait Gallery collection.

References 

Living people
1967 births
Black British lawyers
21st-century English businesspeople
English people of Sierra Leonean descent
English barristers
Lawyers from Essex
Alumni of King's College London
English television presenters
Channel 4 presenters
Private equity and venture capital investors